Jethro Ray Eustice (born 1 November 1989) is a South African field hockey player who plays as a defender for the South African national team.

He represented them in the 2014 Rabobank Men's Hockey World Cup in Den Haag, the 2014 Commonwealth Games at Glasgow and the 2018 Men's Hockey World Cup.

The  Spain V South Africa started with  earning his 150th cap.

He also played provincial under 19s cricket, for KZN Inland. Where he had captained the side against Free State U19 in Bloemfontein. He is the grandson of former Transvaal cricketer Raymond Eustice

References

External links

1989 births
Living people
South African male field hockey players
Male field hockey defenders
Olympic field hockey players of South Africa
2014 Men's Hockey World Cup players
Field hockey players at the 2014 Commonwealth Games
Field hockey players at the 2018 Commonwealth Games
2018 Men's Hockey World Cup players
Field hockey players at the 2020 Summer Olympics
Commonwealth Games competitors for South Africa
People from Benoni
South African cricketers
Field hockey players at the 2022 Commonwealth Games
2023 Men's FIH Hockey World Cup players
University of KwaZulu-Natal alumni

2018 FIH Indoor Hockey World Cup players
2023 FIH Indoor Hockey World Cup players